S. grandis may refer to:
 Schiffermuelleria grandis, a moth species in the genus Schiffermuelleria found in France
 Stypandra grandis, a rhizomatous perennial plant species in the genus Stypandra
 Synaphea grandis, a flowering plant species in the genus Synaphea endemic to Western Australia

Synonyms
 Silybura grandis, a synonym for Uropeltis smithi, a snake species found in India

See also
 Grandis (disambiguation)